Peter John Brady (20 May 1875 – 9 July 1949) was an Australian rules footballer who played with St Kilda in the Victorian Football League (VFL).

References

External links 

1875 births
1949 deaths
Australian rules footballers from Melbourne
St Kilda Football Club players
Brighton Football Club players
People from Caulfield, Victoria